New Country may refer to:

New Country (Armenia), a political party in Armenia
New Country (Sirius), a defunct Modern Country radio station on Sirius Satellite Radio
New Country Hits, a 1965 album by American country music artist George Jones
New Country Party, a political party in Australia
South Sudan, formed on 9 July 2011

See also
Country music
Micronation
 New (disambiguation)
 Country (disambiguation)
New Land (disambiguation)
New states (disambiguation)